The River Woman is a 1928 American drama film directed by Joseph Henabery that is part-silent and part-sound. Made by an independent company, Gotham, the film starred Lionel Barrymore and Jacqueline Logan.

Cast
Lionel Barrymore as Bill Lefty
Jacqueline Logan as The Duchess
Charles Delaney as Jim Henderson
Sheldon Lewis as Mulatto Mike
Harry Todd as The Scrub
Mary Doran as Sally

Preservation
Prints of The River Woman are preserved at the Library of Congress, Cinematek, George Eastman House, BFI National Archive, and UCLA Film and Television Archive.

See also
Lionel Barrymore filmography

References

External links

1928 films
American silent feature films
1928 drama films
Silent American drama films
Films directed by Joseph Henabery
American black-and-white films
Gotham Pictures films
1920s American films